Robling is a surname. Notable people with the surname include:

Claire Robling (born 1956), American politician
Idwal Robling (1927–2011), Welsh sports commentator
Lewis Robling (born 1991), Welsh rugby union player

See also
Roblin (disambiguation)